Inčupe Station is a railway station on the Zemitāni–Skulte Railway. It is planned to close Inčupe station from 2022.

References 

Railway stations in Latvia